J. P. Rizal Avenue, also known as J. P. Rizal Street, is a major local avenue in Makati, Metro Manila, Philippines. It is a contour collector road on the south bank of the Pasig River that runs east–west from Pateros Bridge at the Makati–Pateros boundary to its intersection with Zobel Roxas, Delpan, and Tejeron Streets at the Makati–Manila boundary. The avenue was named after the Philippines' national hero, Dr. José P. Rizal.

J. P. Rizal extends past beneath Circumferential Road 5 into East Rembo, Comembo, and the municipality of Pateros as J. P. Rizal Avenue Extension. West of Zobel Roxas, it continues as Tejeron Street, ending at Pedro Gil Street. The eastern section and extension between Guadalupe Nuevo and Pateros was formerly called Guadalupe–Pateros Road and its section from Lawton Avenue eastwards forms part of McKinley–Pateros Road.

Route description

The road starts at Pateros Bridge, which connects Makati and Pateros, as a continuation of Gen. B. Morcilla Street past Taguig River. It meanders through the residential communities of barangays Comembo, West Rembo, East Rembo, and Cembo. The road continues past Kalayaan Avenue. The Circumferential Road 5 (C-5) then crosses above the avenue; one cannot go into C-5 directly from J.P. Rizal Avenue, except when using Kalayaan Avenue as a conduit. It intersects with Lawton Avenue just past the University of Makati campus which connects it to Bonifacio Global City nearby. The avenue continues west through Guadalupe Nuevo where the Guadalupe ferry terminal and Guadalupe MRT Station are located.

Crossing under the Guadalupe Bridge of Epifanio de los Santos Avenue (EDSA), the road runs through Guadalupe Viejo and Rockwell Center. West of Estrella Street, it enters the Makati Población area passing through the Casa Hacienda Park before coming to an intersection with Makati Avenue.  The road gradually pulls away from the river at this point as it continues on a straight path to Chino Roces Avenue and A.P. Reyes Avenue in barangays Olympia and Tejeros. The section from Makati Avenue then carries one-way traffic westbound especially during daytime and rush hour up to Pasong Tirad. Located on this section are Circuit Makati, formerly the site of Santa Ana Race Track, and the country's most expensive city hall. The avenue then curves northwest past Pasong Tirad before coming to its western terminus at Zobel Roxas and Delpan Streets at the city's border with the Manila, where it extends as Tejeron Street.

History
The road serves as the old main road of Makati, which was once a municipality of the Province of Manila and later of Rizal. It also traversed what was previously part of Pateros. The first Municipal Building of Makati called the Presidencia was also built along the road in 1918 at Plaza Trece de Agosto; it is now occupied today by the Museo ng Makati. The road was historically part of the Manila East Road and Calle Tejeron. Its segment from Malapad-na-bato (now East Rembo, the present-day location of Napindan Hydraulic Control System) westwards was also part of Route 21 or Highway 21 that linked Manila to Calamba, Laguna by circumscribing Laguna de Bay through Rizal, especially during the American colonial era.

Landmarks

 Casa Hacienda Park
 Circuit Makati
 Guadalupe Nuevo Cloverleaf Park
 Holy Cross Parish
 Makati Aqua Sports Arena
 Makati City Hall
 Makati Park and Garden
 Museo ng Makati
 Olympia Market
 Our Lady of Guadalupe Minor Seminary
 Poblacion Park
 Poblacion Sports Complex
 Puregold Makati
 Rockwell Center
 Power Plant Mall
 Proscenium (formerly the Colgate-Palmolive Philippines headquarters until 2008)
 University of Makati

See also
 Pasig River Expressway

References

Streets in Metro Manila